Sybill Morel (February 16, 1899 – ?) was a German stage and film actress of the silent era.

Selected filmography
 The Geisha and the Samurai (1919)
 Opium (1919)
 The Tragedy of a Great (1920)
 Three Nights (1920)
 The Story of Christine von Herre (1921)
 On the Red Cliff (1922)
 Only One Night (1922)
 The Violin King (1923)
 The Affair of Baroness Orlovska (1923)
 Maciste and the Chinese Chest (1923)
 The Vice of Gambling (1923)
 Harry Hill's Deadly Hunt (1925)
 Ash Wednesday (1925)
 The Old Ballroom (1925)
 The Fallen (1926)
 The Awakening of Woman (1927)
 The Holy Lie (1927)
 When the Mother and the Daughter (1928)
 Under the Lantern (1928)
 The Old Fritz (1928)
 Madame Lu (1929)
 Angel in Séparée (1929)
 Storm of Love (1929)

References

Bibliography

External links 
 

1899 births
Year of death unknown
German stage actresses
German film actresses
German silent film actresses
20th-century German actresses
Actors from Mannheim